is a 2018 Japanese anime martial arts fantasy adventure film, directed by Tatsuya Nagamine and written by Dragon Ball series creator Akira Toriyama. It is a canonical reimagining of Dragon Ball Z: Broly – The Legendary Super Saiyan, the twentieth Dragon Ball feature film overall, the third film produced with Toriyama's direct involvement, and the first to carry the Dragon Ball Super branding. 

Set after the events of the "Universe Survival" saga, the film follows Goku and Vegeta as they encounter a powerful Saiyan named Broly. The film also chronicles the history of the Saiyans and the background story of these three Saiyans with different destinies connected to the turbulent period of their race, and later culminating in a massive battle between them.

Broly represents the first appearance of a reworked iteration of Broly in the main Dragon Ball continuity, following the initial version's appearances in the films Broly – The Legendary Super Saiyan (1993), Broly – Second Coming (1994), and Bio-Broly (1994). The film was well-received by critics especially for its animation, fight sequences and Shintani's art style, which was deemed an improvement over the franchise's usual art style drawn by Tadayoshi Yamamuro, coming along with the 3D key animations handled by roub. The film was a box office success, grossing over $124 million worldwide and becoming the highest-grossing Dragon Ball film ever. It also became the highest-grossing anime film of 2018, the fourth highest-grossing anime in the United States and Canada, and the sixteenth highest-grossing anime film of all time.

This was the final Dragon Ball film co-distributed by 20th Century Fox; following the acquisition of 21st Century Fox by Disney on March 20, 2019, the studio no longer distributes films from the franchise due to the dissolution "20th Century Fox Japan", which was absorbed by The Walt Disney Company in September 2020 and replaced by Crunchyroll and Sony Pictures Releasing.

A sequel, titled Dragon Ball Super: Super Hero, was released in 2022.

Plot

In the year of Age 732, after being informed by the galactic warlord King Cold that his race will now serve his son Lord Frieza, King Vegeta finds a commoner infant named Broly within a nursery only the elite are accepted in. Learning Broly's power level greatly excels that of his son Prince Vegeta, whom he believes would liberate their people and conquer the universe, King Vegeta exiles Broly to the distant planetoid Vampa in hopes the infant would die before becoming a potential threat to the Saiyans. Broly's father Paragus attempted to rescue his son, only for the ship he stole to get damaged beyond repair on entry to Vampa. Stuck on Vampa, he raises his son to exact revenge on King Vegeta.

Five years later, a low-class Saiyan warrior named Bardock grows concerned about Frieza's reasons for calling the Saiyans to Planet Vegeta and confines his suspicions to Gine while realizing Frieza's intentions to exterminate their race out of fear of the Super Saiyan and Super Saiyan God legends. They send their infant son, Kakarot, to Earth some time before Frieza commences the genocide of the Saiyan race. Besides Broly, Paragus, and Kakarot, the other survivors of Saiyans include Kakarot's brother Raditz, Vegeta and his comrade Nappa, and Vegeta's brother.

In the year of Age 780, forty-three years later, after the Tournament of Power, Kakarot, now named Goku, trains with Vegeta around a deserted island before Bulma is informed by Trunks that the Dragon Radar and six of the seven magical Dragon Balls in her possession were stolen by low-class Frieza Force soldiers. Bulma leaves Bulla with Beerus while accompanying Goku, Vegeta, and Whis travel to an arctic region to find the seventh Dragon Ball before Frieza can retrieve it. Meanwhile, Broly and Paragus are rescued from Vampa by Cheelai and Lemo, two low-class Frieza Force soldiers on a recruitment mission. The two are brought to Frieza and are enlisted to defeat Goku and Vegeta, Cheelai stealing the remote Paragus uses to keep Broly submissive before the two groups cross paths on Earth.

Broly fights Super Saiyan Vegeta with his increasing power and adaptive fighting abilities allowing him to seemingly best the Saiyan Prince in his Super Saiyan God form. Goku challenges Broly in his base form, Super Saiyan, Super Saiyan God and Super Saiyan Blue forms and manages to gain the advantage despite Broly gaining more strength while Paragus fears the worst upon learning he lost the means to snap Broly out from his berserker state. However, remembering the circumstances that allowed Goku to first acquire his Super Saiyan form, Frieza covertly kills Paragus to awaken Broly's latent Super Saiyan powers. The fully mindless Broly overwhelms both Goku and Vegeta in their Super Saiyan Blue forms before being directed to attack Frieza while Goku uses his instantaneous movement technique to get him and Vegeta to Piccolo. The two proceed to teach Vegeta the Fusion Dance technique as he and Goku eventually succeed in forming Gogeta, who arrives to the battlefield as Broly attacks Whis after defeating Golden Frieza. Gogeta dominates the fight before an infuriated Broly powers up even further into his Super Saiyan Full Power form, countering by assuming Super Saiyan Blue with their violent clash breaking through multiple dimensions before arriving back on Earth.

Gogeta defeats Broly using Meteor Explosion and nearly kills him with an Ultimate Kamehameha but Cheelai and Lemo, who had formed a friendship with Broly, summon the eternal dragon Shenron with the Dragon Balls and use their wish to transport Broly safely back to Vampa. The two then escape with Gogeta preventing their ship from being destroyed by Frieza, who decides to spare them as they can make Broly a more stable asset to his military force. Some time after, Goku arrives on Vampa to provide Cheelai and Lemo with supplies while expressing his intent to spar with Broly and help teach him control his power. Formally introducing himself before leaving, Goku tells Broly to call him Kakarot.

Voice cast

Production

Development

The film is produced by Toei Animation. It was originally announced under the tentative title of Dragon Ball Super - The Movie on December 17, 2017, during Jump Festa with the general theme being "The Strongest Warrior Race in the Universe, The Saiyans". A poster was released on March 13, 2018, 11 days before the airing of the final episode of Dragon Ball Super, featuring an entirely new traditional animation design by Toei animator Naohiro Shintani, as opposed to veteran Dragon Ball character designer Tadayoshi Yamamuro. One week later, the first trailer for the film was released publicly through Toei Animation featuring the all–new character designs and an enigmatic new villain. Akira Toriyama wrote the story, screenplay and designed the characters, Tatsuya Nagamine is film director, Naohiro Shintani is animation director, Kazuo Ogura is serving as art director, Rumiko Nagai as color designer, Naotake Oota is in charge of special effects, and Kai Makino is the CG director. The film includes elements of the 2014 "Dragon Ball −(Minus): The Departure of the Fated Child" story written by Toriyama.

On July 9, 2018, the film's title was revealed to be Dragon Ball Super: Broly, revealing the unknown villain to be the titular character Broly who first appeared in the 1993 film Dragon Ball Z: Broly – The Legendary Super Saiyan. Toriyama stated the character and his origin is reworked, but with his classic image in mind. With this film portrayal, the character would become part of the Dragon Ball Super official continuity. Other new characters introduced in the film are Goku's mother Gine, Kikono, Berryblue, Cheelai, and Lemo serving in the Frieza's army, and the Saiyan Beets.

Music
The film score was composed by Norihito Sumitomo. The original soundtrack, containing 34 tracks, was released on 12 December, by Avex Trax. In August 2018, was reported a rumor that the Dragon Ball Z iconic theme song "Cha-La Head-Cha-La" would be also featured in a new arrangement. In October 2018, it was announced that Daichi Miura would perform the film's theme song "Blizzard", which was released as a single on 19 December, by Sonic Groove. Three versions of the single "Blizzard" were released (CD+DVD Edition, Single CD Edition and CD "Dragon Ball Super: Broly" Cover Edition). In its first week of release the CD single sold 22,826 copies. In his sixth week in the Charts, "Blizzard" reached number 2 on the Billboard Japan Hot 100 and achieved the number 1 on the Billboard Hot Animation.

Marketing

Promotion
On July 19, 2018, theatrical trailers for both the subtitled and dubbed versions were released online after being shown at San Diego Comic-Con. On October 5, 2018, the second trailer for both the subtitled and dubbed versions were released online after being shown at New York Comic Con during the Dragon Ball Super: Broly panel at the Hulu Theater at Madison Square Garden. The third trailer was released on November 7, 2018, but only subtitled, while dubbed version on 20 December. The fourth which was a music trailer featuring the theme song "Blizzard" was released on November 24, 2018. The fifth and final trailer was released on 29 November 2018, with a dubbed version, also of the theme song, on 4 December 2018. Each trailer covered a different aspect of the film; the first introduced Broly and his fights against Vegeta, Goku and Frieza, the second their origin stories, the third more scenes from the fights, the fourth recapped previous scenes, and fifth which was the shortest introduced Gogeta's battle against Broly.

Beginning July 20, the first 50,000 pre-order ticket holders in Japan received a char of Goku or Vegeta. A promotional one-hour television special aired on Fuji TV in Japan on December 2, 2018, entitled "Just before the Dragon Ball Super debut! TV version climax recap".

Merchandise
In North America, anime distributor Funimation hosted the "Dragon Ball North America Tour 2018 with Bandai Collectibles" to promote the film. The tour was held in seven cities in the United States and Canada, starting with a San Diego Comic-Con International panel on July 19, and ending at Dallas Fan Days on October 21, 2018. Fathom Events and Toei Animation also held two limited North American theatrical screenings of past Dragon Ball films that featured characters from Dragon Ball Super: Broly. A screening of Broly - The Legendary Super Saiyan (1993) was held in September 2018, while Bardock - The Father of Goku (1990) and Fusion Reborn (1995), billed together as Dragon Ball Z: Saiyan Double Feature, were screened the following November. To promote the North American release of the film, a Goku balloon was flown during the 92nd Macy's Thanksgiving Day Parade in 2018.

Video games
The film's versions of Gogeta and Broly appear as playable characters via downloadable content (DLC) in the video games Dragon Ball Xenoverse 2 and Dragon Ball FighterZ. Xenoverse 2 also features Super Saiyan God Vegeta as DLC.

Novelization
A novelization of the film, written by Masatoshi Kusakabe, was released on December 14, 2018. The novel adds additional details not present in the film, such as the names of two Saiyans, Leek and Taro, who appeared early in the film. It was one of the twenty top-selling light novels of January 2019, selling 10,466 copies in Japan. The film was also adapted into an anime comic on May 2, 2019, featuring cover art by the film's animation supervisor Naohiro Shintani.

Release

Theatrical

Premiere
The world premiere of Dragon Ball Super: Broly was held at the Nippon Budokan in Chiyoda, Tokyo on November 14, 2018. This event was limited to only 1,000 guests that were selected via lottery through Weekly Shōnen Jump No.47 and the December V Jump. Broly was open nationwide in Japan on December 14, 2018, while Funimation's English dub had its world premiere at TCL Chinese Theatre in Los Angeles on December 13 followed by its United States and Canada release a month later on January 16, 2019, by Funimation Films. The film was screened in Bangladesh by Star Cineplex on January 18, 2019, making it the first anime as well as Dragon Ball film to release in the country's theater. In the United Kingdom and Ireland, Manga Entertainment screened the film theatrically from January 23, 2019. In Australia and New Zealand, Madman Entertainment screened the film theatrically from January 24, 2019, and also screened the IMAX and 4DX versions of the film in select cinemas. 20th Century Fox released the film theatrically in the Philippines on January 30, 2019. On February 28, 2019, both Hong Kong and Italy projected the film theatrically through distributors Neofilms and Anime Factory respectively. In the France, Viz Media Europe screened the film theatrically from March 13, 2019. PVR Cinemas released the film in India on March 29, 2019, making it the second film of its franchise to be theatrically released in India. In China, the film premiered theatrically on May 24, 2019.

Distribution
The film was distributed in Japan by Toei Company in cooperation with the Japanese branch of 20th Century Fox, who also handled distribution in some international territories making it the last film in the franchise co-distributed by Fox due the dissolution of the Japanese branch absorbed by Disney Japan in September 2020. On July 7, 2018, Funimation bought the film's international rights in the United States and Canada. In addition to regular screenings, it is also screened in IMAX, MX4D, and 4DX. The film is the first anime to be screened in IMAX in the United States, with a limited projection beginning January 16, 2019.

Home media
On April 16, 2019, Funimation released to the North American market the package of Blu-ray discs, DVD and digital combo of the film. The Blu-ray release contains bonus interviews with the English voice cast; Vic Mignogna was initially advertised as featuring, but his material was omitted following sexual assault accusations made against him and his removal from future Funimation projects in response. Some viewers criticized the picture quality of Funimation's releases for adding a "green tint" to the color, which Funimation defended as being "identical" to the theatrical release.

In United Kingdom, Manga Entertainment released the DVD and Blu-ray on May 27, 2019; this version did not include the interviews featured on the American release and was not affected by the green color issues. Selecta Visión launched in Spain the regular Blu-ray / DVD editions and the Collector's Edition of the film on May 29, 2019.

The film was released in Japan in regular and limited edition DVD and Blu-ray formats on June 5, 2019. The Limited editions for both formats include an bonus DVD featuring TV spot, promotional clips, world premiere event at Nippon Budokan and an event held on December 15, 2018. Also includes tin badges featuring Saiyan, 32 postcards, an original card folder and a 60-page booklet. The home video of Dragon Ball Super: Broly debuted at number 1 in the Japan's Animation DVD and Blu-ray Ranking and sold approximately 64,259 copies in its first week. For the second consecutive week, Dragon Ball Super: Broly continued to occupy the number 1 spot, adding another 10,291 copies. In its third week, it sold 4,540 copies approximately.

In Australia and New Zealand, Madman Entertainment released the film on DVD and Blu-ray on June 19, 2019. Koch Media released the film in Italy on DVD and Blu-ray on June 20, 2019. On July 17, 2019, Wild Side Video released the DVD and Blu-ray of the film in France. KAZÉ Anime released the film's DVD and Blu-ray in Germany on December 5, 2019.

Reception

Box office

Japan
In its opening weekend between 14 and 16 December 2018, the film was shown on 467 screens in Japan, and surpassed Dragon Ball Z: Resurrection 'F' to set a new opening weekend record for the franchise. In its first six days it sold more than 1 million tickets and earned . The Mainichi Shimbun newspaper reported that the film has earned more than ¥2 billion (US$18.1 million) after 11 days at the box office, being the fastest film in the franchise to hit that mark. It has also sold more than 1.5 million tickets. After three weekends, on 31 December it earned $23.6 million in Japan, and roughly $24.4 million internationally.

According to Crunchyroll, after 24 days the film earned  on 2,604,870 tickets in Japan. After 32 days of release (14 December 2018 to 14 January 2019), the film had earned , with 2,823,215 tickets having been sold. On seventh weekend, the film dropped from sixth to ninth place. As of 3 February 2019, the film has sold 3,009,730 tickets and grossed ¥3,895,569,200 in Japan.

Other territories
After four weekends, on 6 January 2019, it was estimated to have earned $32.3 million worldwide, with $29.7 million coming from Japan and $3.3 million from five other countries, including the highest-grossing opening by a Japanese film in Brazil with $1.7 million, and by a Japanese animation film in Malaysia with $232,000. During its release on 10 January in Latin America, in Peru the film had the second best premiere in history reaching 257,420 spectators on its first day of release, only surpassed by the Avengers: Infinity War with 291,629 in 2018, as well best premiere for an animation film in Bolivia. In Argentina, Bolivia, Paraguay, Puerto Rico and Uruguay the film also debuted at number-one at the box office. In its first Latin America weekend it grossed reportedly over $6.1 million in Mexico alone, while according to Deadline Hollywood, "Peru ($2.5 million) and Argentina ($1.55 million) gave Fox its biggest opening weekend ever, followed by Chile ($1.7 million) with the industry's 3rd biggest animation opening of all time. In Colombia it was Fox's 4th biggest opening weekend ever at $1.5 million and in Ecuador, the Toei anime fantasy is Fox's top launch ever, and the 3rd best superhero bow, behind Avengers: Infinity War and Thor: Ragnarok" with $1.3 million. In its fifth weekend ending 13 January 2019, the film grossed $19.2 million from 17 territories, becoming the weekend's third top-grossing film in international markets, behind only Bumblebee and Aquaman, which brought the film's worldwide gross to $53.5 million ahead of its United States release. On the weekend ending 20 January, the international cume had increased to $65.9 million, holding onto the number 1 spot in Chile ($3 million), Peru ($3.8 million) and Ecuador. The film's gross increased to $9.5 million in Mexico, $4.3 million in Brazil, $2.6 million in Argentina and $2.4 million in Colombia. Alongside its domestic total, the worldwide gross increased to $88.7 million.

Despite limited release In the United States the film earned $7.03 million on its opening day, which was a new series record, besting Resurrection 'F'''s $1.97 million. It again topped the United States box office on its second day of release with $3.3 million, for a two-day total of $10.4 million. It earned $2.39 million on Friday (18 January), earning $12.8 million total in its first three days. In its second weekend it fell 63% to $3.6 million, finishing 10th. It is the 11th highest grossing anime film internationally of all time.

Among non Fox distributed markets, in the United Kingdom and Ireland, it became the third highest-grossing anime film ever, earning £850,000 on its first weekend. It eventually became the second highest-grossing upon surpassing £1 million ($1.3 million).

It debuted at number 7 in Australia and number 1 in New Zealand, raising AUS$1,322,182 and $309,209 respectively. In the Netherlands, it raised €377,570 in its first week of release, entering at number 4. About 73,000 people saw the film on its premier on 29 January in Germany where it grossed €854,000 ($970,000). It debuted at number 3 in Spain and earned $1.82 million after its fourth weekend. It debuted at number 1 in Italy earning €1.7 million ($1.9 million) in its opening week. By its second weekend the gross had increased to €2.31 million ($2.6 million).

On 3 March 2019, the film was reported by the official Dragon Ball news site to have earned over ¥12 billion ($107 million) at the worldwide box office. , the film was reported in Toei Animations's fiscal report to have grossed over ¥13 billion ($118 million) at the worldwide box office. In China, where it released on 24 May 2019, the film debuted with a  opening weekend.

Critical response
The website's critical consensus reads, "Dragon Ball Super: Broly may seem like colorful chaos to newcomers, but for longtime fans, it represents this long-running franchise near its action-packed apogee." On Metacritic, which assigns a normalized rating to reviews, the film has a weighted average score of 59 out of 100 based on 6 critics, indicating "mixed or average reviews". According to Pia's first-day satisfaction survey of Japanese audiences, it ranked as No 1. with an audience approval rating of 92.7%, while American audiences gave the film five out of five stars on PostTrak, including a 91% positive score and 78% "definite recommend."

It received critical acclaim from the initial critical reviews by Anime News Network, IGN, and Comic Book praising the story, animation style, humour, as well Broly for making the film a "meaningful character piece about a broken man haunted by his abuse-filled past—twisted into something he was never destined to become". In a 5 out of 5 stars review by Stuff, it was considered as the "best Dragon Ball film" with the only prominent critical point that "there are certain scenes where it transitions between 2D animation and 3D ... which can disrupt the flow of it all". Ollie Barder writing for Forbes, stated that the "only real criticism at this point is that after this solid narrative starting setup, we have a pretty hefty time jump to where we are post-Dragon Ball Super. Considering the depth and breadth of the story between these points of time, it would have been nice to have a bit more exposition to help with the pacing. However, that said, this is already a long film and we all know that we have a massive fight to look forward to". Allegra Frank of Polygon concluded that the film "gets the fundamentals of Dragon Ball extremely right, no matter where you're coming in from", with "no grand statements to be made in Dragon Ball Super: Broly, and more amusement than anxiety".

Accolades

Anime comic adaptationDragon Ball Super: Broly'' has been adapted into an anime comic, using shots from the film put into manga format. Featuring a cover illustration by Naohiro Shintani, the single volume was released in Japan on May 2, 2019.

Notes

References

External links
 
 
 

2010s Japanese-language films
2018 anime films
2018 martial arts films
20th Century Fox animated films
20th Century Fox films
Adventure anime and manga
Akira Toriyama
Broly
Fantasy anime and manga
Films directed by Tatsuya Nagamine
Films set on fictional planets
Funimation
Genocide in fiction
IMAX films
Japanese action films
Martial arts anime and manga
Martial arts fantasy films
Toei Animation films